Harris Bus was an English bus operator that operated services under contract to Transport for London.

History
Harris Bus was established in October 1986 as bus and coach operator in Grays. In 1997 it diversified, operating routes under contract to London Regional Transport winning tenders to operate routes 108, 128, 129, 132, 150 and 180.

In December 1999, Harris Bus was placed in administration with its London services taken over by London Regional Transport's East Thames Buses subsidiary.

References

External links
Flickr gallery
Showbus gallery

Former London bus operators
1986 establishments in England
1999 disestablishments in England
Former bus operators in Essex
British companies established in 1986
British companies disestablished in 1999